Erasmo Marotta (1576–1641) was a Jesuit Sicilian composer of motets and madrigals.  He was born in Randazzo and died in Palermo.

Editions
 Mottetti concertati: a due, tre, quattro e cinque voci ed. Irene Calagna 2002 pp147

Recordings
Fecit Deus. Quis mihi det. on Fabellae Sacrae. Savadi. 2008

References

1565 births
1641 deaths
Italian Baroque composers
17th-century Italian composers
Italian male classical composers
17th-century male musicians